Steven V. Roberts (born February 11, 1943) is an American journalist, writer, and political commentator.

Life and career
Roberts was born in Bayonne, New Jersey, and graduated from Bayonne High School. He attended Harvard University, where he served as editor of the student newspaper, The Harvard Crimson. After graduating with a B.A. in Government in 1964, Roberts was hired by The New York Times as research assistant to James Reston, then the paper's Washington, D.C. bureau chief. He was a senior writer at U.S. News & World Report for seven years where he is now a contributing editor.  As a Washington pundit, Roberts appears regularly on ABC Radio, Washington Week in Review, CNN, Hardball with Chris Matthews. He often filled in as substitute host of The Diane Rehm Show on  NPR (National Public Radio). He also appears regularly on America Abroad. Roberts has taught journalism and political communication at The George Washington University's School of Media and Public Affairs since 1997.

Roberts and his wife, Cokie Roberts, wrote a nationally syndicated newspaper column and were contributing writers for USA Weekend, a Sunday magazine that appears in 500 newspapers nationwide. In February 2000, they jointly published From This Day Forward.  They have two children, Lee and Rebecca, and six grandchildren.

Books
Cokie: A Life Well Lived is Steve's 2021 tribute about Cokie and her legacy.
Our Haggadah: Uniting Traditions for Interfaith Families is his 2011 book co-authored with his wife, Cokie Roberts.
From Every End of This Earth: 13 Families and the New Lives They Made in America, 2009.
My Fathers' Houses, 2005.
From This Day Forward, (with Cokie Roberts), Morrow, 2000.

References

Sources
Steve Roberts bio from George Washington University

External links

Steve Roberts on Media Bias 28 March 2005 
America Abroad
obit of twin with biographical info on Steven V. Roberts https://www.bostonglobe.com/metro/obituaries/2014/07/29/marc-roberts-chestnut-hill-harvard-school-public-health-professor-had-global-reach-economics-teacher-and-consultant/v41p3cyjbSEjNH2YONAE6J/story.html

1943 births
Living people
American male journalists
Bayonne High School alumni
The Harvard Crimson people
George Washington University faculty
Writers from Bayonne, New Jersey
Steven
Boggs family
Claiborne family